The 1975–76 Montreal Canadiens season was the club's 67th season. The Canadiens won their 19th Stanley Cup in club history.

Offseason

Regular season
Henri Richard's number 16 was retired December 10, 1975, by the Canadiens in his honour.

Final standings

Schedule and results

Player statistics

Regular season
Scoring

Goaltending

Playoffs
Scoring

Goaltending

Transactions

Playoffs

Stanley Cup Finals

Guy Lafleur scored his first two career goals in the finals, both game-winners.

Reggie Leach scored four time in the finals, and 19 for the play-offs to win the Conn Smythe Trophy despite the Flyers losing to the Canadiens.

Montreal Canadiens vs. Philadelphia Flyers

Montreal wins the series 4–0.

Reggie Leach won the Conn Smythe Trophy as playoff MVP.

Awards and records
 Prince of Wales Trophy
 Ken Dryden, Vezina Trophy
 Guy Lafleur, Art Ross Trophy

Draft picks

Farm teams

See also
 1975–76 NHL season

References
 Canadiens on Hockey Database
 Canadiens on NHL Reference

Stanley Cup championship seasons
Norris Division champion seasons
Montreal Canadiens seasons
Montreal Canadiens season, 1975-76
Eastern Conference (NHL) championship seasons
Mon